Krasny (masculine), Krasnaya (feminine), or Krasnoye (neuter), Russian for red, may refer to:

People
Michael Krasny (disambiguation), several people

Places
Krasny, Russia (Krasnaya, Krasnoye), name of several inhabited localities in Russia
Krasni, Nagorno-Karabakh, a village in the Republic of Artsakh, also known as Dağdağan (Azerbaijani)
Krasnoye, former name of Chambarak, Armenia
 Krasnoye, Belarus

Other
Krasnaya (river), a river in Kaliningrad Oblast, Russia
Krasny (surname), a Russian language surname
Krasnaya (Kazanka), a river in the Republic of Tatarstan, Russia
Krasnaya Hotel, former name of Bristol Hotel in Odessa, Ukraine

See also
Krasny Oktyabr (disambiguation)

Surnames from nicknames